Kolgaon is a village in the Shrigonda Taluka of Ahmednagar district in Maharashtra state, India.

Demographics
Covering  and comprising 245 households at the time of the 2011 census of India, Kolgaon had a population of 999. There were 502 males and 497 females, with 94 people being aged six or younger.

References

Villages in Ahmednagar district